The simple station Calle 106 is part of the TransMilenio mass-transit system of Bogotá, Colombia, which opened in the year 2000.

Location

The station is located in northern Bogotá, specifically on Autopista Norte with Calle 105.

It serves the Santa Bibiana, Estoril and San Patricio neighborhoods.

History
After the opening of the Portal de Usme in early 2001, the Autopista Norte line was opened. This station was added as a northerly expansion of that line, which was completed with the opening of the Portal del Norte later that year.

The station is named Calle 106 due to its proximity to that important road in northeastern Bogotá.

Nearby are locations of Jasban (dental clinic) and the main clinic of the EPS Colsanitas.

On the night of April 9, 2013, attacks against this system station were recorded. On that occasion, the stations Calle 100 (TransMilenio), Calle 106 (TransMilenio), Prado, Alcalá, Calle 142 (TransMilenio), Calle 146 (TransMilenio), Mazurén (TransMilenio), Calle 161 (TransMilenio), Calle 187 (TransMilenio), and Terminal (TM) with Autopista Norte, where they left $ 22 million Weights in losses

Station Services

Old trunk services

Main line service

Feeder routes

This station does not have connections to feeder routes.

Inter-city service

This station does not have inter-city service.

External links
TransMilenio

See also
Bogotá
TransMilenio
List of TransMilenio Stations

TransMilenio